Sydney Joseph Smith (11 July 1895 – ?) was an English footballer of the 1920s. Born in Aston, he played professionally for Derby County, Norwich City and Gillingham, making a total of 8 appearances in The Football League.

References

1895 births
Footballers from Birmingham, West Midlands
English Football League players
Stourbridge F.C. players
Derby County F.C. players
Norwich City F.C. players
Gillingham F.C. players
English footballers
Association footballers not categorized by position
Year of death missing